The Shreveport Captains (1971–2000) and Shreveport Swamp Dragons (2001–02) were a professional minor-league baseball team based in Shreveport, Louisiana. They were affiliated with the California Angels (1971–72), Milwaukee Brewers (1973–74), Pittsburgh Pirates (1975–78) and San Francisco Giants (1979–2002). 

After the 2002 season, the team moved to Frisco, Texas, to become the Frisco RoughRiders.

Season-by-season

Major league alumni
Mike Aldrete (Giants, Expos,  Padres, Indians, Athletics, Angels, Yankees)
Rich Aurilia (Giants, Mariners, Reds)
Marvin Benard (Giants)
Jeff Brantley (SF Giants, Reds, Cardinals, Philies, Rangers)
Troy Brohawn (SF Giants, Arizona Diamondbacks, LA Dodgers)
Nate Bump (Marlins)
John Burkett (SF Giants, Texas Rangers, Atlanta Braves, Boston Red Sox)
Jay Canizaro (Giants, Twins)
Royce Clayton (Giants, Cardinals, Rangers, White Sox, Brewers, Rockies, Diamondbacks, Nationals)
Dennis Cook (Giants, Indians, Mets, Angels)
Chili Davis (Giants, Angels, Yankees, Twins, Royals)
Pedro Feliz (SF Giants)
Jesse Foppert (Giants)
Keith Foulke (Giants, White Sox, Red Sox)
Aaron Fultz (Giants, Rangers, Twins, Phillies)
Scott Garrelts (Giants)
Joey Gathright (Devil Rays, Royals, Cubs, Red Sox)
Rick Honeycutt (Mariners, Dodgers, A's, Rangers, Cardinals)
Sixto Lezcano (Brewers, Padres, Phillies, Cardinals)
Scott Linebrink (Giants, Astros, Padres, Brewers, White Sox, Braves)
Ramón Martínez (Giants, Cubs, Tigers, Phillies, Dodgers)
Damon Minor (Giants)
Doug Mirabelli (Giants, Red Sox, Rangers, Padres)
Bill Mueller (Giants, Cubs, Red Sox, Dodgers)
Calvin Murray (Giants, Rangers, Cubs)
Joe Nathan (Giants, Twins, Rangers, Tigers)
Lance Niekro (Giants)
Tom O'Malley (Giants, Mets, Orioles, Rangers)
Russ Ortiz (Giants, Braves, Diamondbacks, Orioles)
Mike Remlinger (Giants, Mets, Reds, Braves, Cubs, Red Sox)
Chris Singleton (White Sox, Orioles, A's, Devil Rays)
Yorvit Torrealba (Giants, Rockies, Mariners)
Jason Grilli (Giants, Marlins, White Sox, Tigers, Rockies, Rangers, Pirates, Angels, and Blue Jays)
Rod Beck  (Giants, Cubs, Red Sox, and Padres)

References

 
Defunct Dixie Association teams
Defunct Texas League teams
Defunct minor league baseball teams
Baseball teams established in 1971
Baseball teams disestablished in 2002
Captains
Professional baseball teams in Louisiana
California Angels minor league affiliates
Milwaukee Brewers minor league affiliates
Pittsburgh Pirates minor league affiliates
San Francisco Giants minor league affiliates
1971 establishments in Louisiana
2002 disestablishments in Louisiana
Defunct baseball teams in Louisiana